HD 180314 is a star in the constellation Lyra. Its apparent magnitude is 6.61 and it is about 400 light years from the Sun. This is a K-type star with 2.48 times the mass of the Sun, 8.10 times the Sun's radius, and an effective temperature of about 5,000 K.

The star is orbited by one substellar companion, HD 180314 b, an object with a minimum mass 22 times that of Jupiter and hence likely to be a brown dwarf. It orbits HD 180314 every 396 days with a semi-major axis of 1.4 AU. HD 180314 b's orbit is moderately eccentric, with an orbital eccentricity of 0.257.

References

Lyra (constellation)
K-type giants
Durchmusterung objects
180314
094576
Planetary systems with one confirmed planet